Haywood Patterson (December 12, 1912 – August 24, 1952) was one of the Scottsboro Boys (See Powell v. Alabama). He was accused of raping Victoria Price and Ruby Bates. He wrote a book about his experience, Scottsboro Boy.

Patterson was in his late teens when he and eight other young black boys were accused of raping two white women on a train in 1931. Patterson was given the death sentence three times, but after appeals and retrials he was eventually sentenced to 75 years in prison. In 1948, Patterson escaped from prison and fled to Detroit. He was arrested by the FBI a few years later but was not extradited to Alabama. After a deadly bar fight he was again sentenced to prison where he soon died of cancer at the age of thirty-nine.

In 2013, the Alabama Board of Pardons and Paroles posthumously pardoned Patterson along with two other Scottsboro boys, Charles Weems and Andy Wright. They were the last men whose convictions had not yet been overturned or pardoned.

Joshua Henry played Patterson in the original Broadway cast of The Scottsboro Boys musical.

References

Resources
"Long Journey." Time Magazine Published 10 July 1950. Accessed 30 April 2008.

African-American history between emancipation and the civil rights movement
1912 births
1952 deaths
20th-century American memoirists
African-American non-fiction writers
American non-fiction writers
People who have received posthumous pardons
20th-century African-American writers